Elysian Park is one of the largest parks in Los Angeles at 600 acres (240 ha). Most of Elysian Park falls in the neighborhood of the same name, but a small portion of the park falls in Echo Park.

The park was created by city ordinance on April 5, 1886. City engineer George Hansen sponsored the ordinance. The land was considered "worthless" at the time. At the time, only a few other parks existed within the Los Angeles city limits. For some time the land sat unimproved, but eventually roads, trails, and landscaping was added.

Parts of Elysian Park were swapped for other lands held by the Los Angeles Dodgers when Dodger Stadium was built.

Notable features

Angels Point is a small hill in Elysian Park overlooking Dodger Stadium and the Downtown Los Angeles Skyline. Atop the hill is a large metal sculpture art installation by local artist Peter Shire of the 1980s postmodern Memphis Group.

Chavez Ravine Arboretum, opened in 1893 and contains more than 100 varieties of trees from around the world, including what are believed to be the oldest and largest Cape Chestnut, Kauri, and Tipu trees in the United States.

Grace E. Simons Lodge, an event space with waterfalls and reception rooms. It is named after the activist who stopped the construction of a convention center on the park grounds. 

Marion Harlow Memorial Grove is a small tree and plant grove along the Elysian Park hiking trail.

The Avenue of the Palms was planted around 1895.

History

References

External links
 
 http://historicechopark.org/history-landmarks/places-landmarks/elysian-park/
 A history of the park's early days
 Another history of the park

Parks in Los Angeles
1886 establishments in California
Elysian Park, Los Angeles
Echo Park, Los Angeles